The Gendarme and the Gendarmettes is a 1982 French comedy film, and the sixth and last movie of the Gendarme series . It is the final film of the director Jean Girault and the lead actor Louis de Funès, both of which were involved in the franchise since its very first film in 1964.

Synopsis 
Four young beautiful female police officers come to learn from the "masters" but it turns out they are coping much better with the problem than their teachers. But things heat up when the "gendarmettes" are kidnapped one by one.

Auto stunt scene
Reminiscent of the motorcycle stunt driving scene in the 1968 installment Le gendarme se marie, France Rumilly featured again as the stunt driving nun, "Soeur Clotilde", this time in a spectacular and comedic scene, driving a Citroën 2CV, a year after James Bond drove a 2CV in For Your Eyes Only, but including the gag whereby the car breaks up in two pieces, and the driver continues driving the front-wheel drive front half of the car, three years before this gag is repeated by James Bond in a Renault 11, in the 1985 film A View to a Kill.

External links 
 

1982 films
Films shot in Saint-Tropez
French comedy films
1980s French-language films
Films directed by Jean Girault
Films set in Saint-Tropez
1980s police comedy films
Women in law enforcement in fiction
1982 comedy films
1980s French films